The Put-in-Bay Dolomite is a geologic formation in Michigan and Ohio. It preserves fossils dating back to the Silurian period.  The type locality is South Bass Island in western Lake Erie.

References
 

Silurian Michigan